Havoc is the fourth studio album by Norwegian progressive metal band Circus Maximus, released on 18 March 2016. The deluxe edition includes a bonus track and an additional disc featuring a 2012 live performance in Japan.

Track listing

Personnel
Circus Maximus
 Michael Eriksen − Lead vocals
 Mats Haugen − Guitar, backing vocals, programming, producer
 Truls Haugen − Drums, percussion, backing vocals
 Lasse Finbråten − Keyboards, samples, programming
 Glen Cato Møllen − Bass

Additional personnel
 Christer Andre Cederberg - Mixing

Charts

References

External links 
 Official Circus Maximus website

Circus Maximus (Norwegian band) albums
2016 albums
Frontiers Records albums